Oleksandr Papush (born 14 January 1985) is a Ukrainian professional footballer.

Career
In March 2017, Papush was one of several Isloch Minsk Raion players alleged to be involved in match fixing.

On 20 February 2018, the BFF banned Papush for 24 months for his involvement in the match fixing. In April 2019 the remainder of his term has been replaced with probation and he resumed playing for Isloch soon thereafter.

References

External links

1985 births
Living people
Ukrainian footballers
Association football defenders
Ukrainian expatriate footballers
Expatriate footballers in Belarus
Expatriate footballers in Kazakhstan
FC Mariupol players
FC Illichivets-2 Mariupol players
FC SKVICH Minsk players
FC Dynamo Brest players
FC Torpedo-BelAZ Zhodino players
FC Kaisar players
FC Rechitsa-2014 players
FC Isloch Minsk Raion players
Ukrainian expatriate sportspeople in Belarus
Sportspeople from Mariupol